Ohio Township is the name of four townships in Indiana:
Ohio Township, Bartholomew County, Indiana
Ohio Township, Crawford County, Indiana
Ohio Township, Spencer County, Indiana
Ohio Township, Warrick County, Indiana

Indiana township disambiguation pages